Eustalodes oenosema is a moth in the family Gelechiidae. It was described by Edward Meyrick in 1927. It is found on Samoa.

References

Chelariini
Moths described in 1927
Taxa named by Edward Meyrick